Protein S100-A1, also known as S100 calcium-binding protein A1 is a protein which in humans is encoded by the S100A1  gene. S100A1 is highly expressed in cardiac and skeletal muscle, and localizes to Z-discs and sarcoplasmic reticulum. S100A1 has shown promise as an effective candidate for gene therapy to treat post-myocardially infarcted cardiac tissue.

Structure 
S100A1 is a member of the S100 family of proteins expressed in cardiac muscle, skeletal muscle and brain, with highest density at Z-lines and sarcoplasmic reticulum. S100A1 contains 4 EF-hand calcium-binding motifs in its dimerized form, and can exist as either a hetero or homodimer. The S100A1 homodimer is high affinity (nanomolar range or tighter), and is formed through hydrophobic packing of an X-type 4-helix bundle created between helices 1, 1', 4, and 4'. Protein nuclear magnetic resonance spectroscopy structural information on the homodimeric form of this protein shows that each monomer is helical and contains two EF-hand calcium-binding loops; one in the N-terminus and a canonical EF hand in the C-terminus having higher calcium affinity (dissociation constant of roughly 20 micromolar). The two EF hand domains neighbor each other in three dimensional space, and are connected to each other through a short beta sheet region (residues 27–29 and 68–70).

Upon binding calcium, helix 3 of S100A1 re-orients from being relatively antiparallel to helix 4 to being roughly perpendicular.  This conformational change is different from most EF hands, in that the entering helix, and not the exiting helix, moves.  This conformational change exposes a large hydrophobic pocket between helix 3, 4, and the hinge region of S100A1 that is involved in virtually all calcium-dependent target protein interactions.  These biophysical properties seem to be well conserved across the S100 family of proteins.  Helix 3, 4, and the hinge region are the most divergent areas between individual S100 proteins, and so it is likely that the sequence of these regions is pivotal in fine-tuning calcium-dependent target binding by S100 proteins. S-Nitrosylation of S100A1 at Cys85 reorganizes the conformation of S100A1 at the C-terminal helix and the linker connecting the two EF hand domains.

The most accurate high-resolution solution structure of human apo-S100A1 protein (PDB accession code: 2L0P) has been determined by means of NMR spectroscopy in 2011.

S100 genes include at least 19 members which are located as a cluster on chromosome 1q21.

Function 
S100 proteins are localized in the cytoplasm and/or nucleus of a wide range of cells, and involved in the regulation of a number of cellular processes such as cell cycle progression and differentiation. This protein may function in stimulation of Ca2+-induced Ca2+ release, inhibition of microtubule assembly, and inhibition of protein kinase C-mediated phosphorylation.

S100A1 is expressed during development in the primitive heart at embryonic day 8 in levels that are similar between atria and ventricles. As development progresses up to embryonic day 17.5, S100A1 expression shifts to a lower levels in atria and higher levels in ventricular myocardium.

S100A1 has shown to be a regulator of myocardial contractility. S100A1 overexpression via adenoviral gene transfer in adult rabbit cardiomyocytes or a cardiac-restricted S100A1 murine transgenic enhanced cardiac contractile performance by increasing sarcoplasmic reticular calcium transients and uptake, altering the calcium sensitivity and cooperativity of myofibrils, enhancing SERCA2A activity and enhancing calcium-induced calcium release. Specifically, S100A1 increases the gain of excitation-contraction coupling and decreases calcium spark frequency in cardiomyocytes. Enhancement of L-type calcium channel transsarcolemmal calcium influx by S100A has been shown to be dependent on protein kinase A. Effects of S100A1 on myofilament proteins may be via Titin; S100A1 has been shown to interact with the PEVK region of Titin in a calcium-dependent manner, and its binding reduces the force in an in vitro motility assay, suggesting that S100A may modulate Titin-based passive tension prior to systole. In mice with ablation of the S100A1 gene (S100A1-/-), cardiac reserve upon beta adrenergic stimulation was impaired, showing reduced contraction rate and relaxation rate, as well as reduced calcium sensitivity. However, S100A1-/- did not show the eventual cardiac hypertrophy or chamber dilation in aged mice.

In animal models of disease, S100A1 protein levels has been shown to be altered in right ventricular hypertrophied tissue in a model of pulmonary hypertension; several tissue types (brain, skeletal muscle and cardiac muscle) in a model of type I diabetes mellitus; S100A1 has been demonstrated as a regulator of the genetic program underlying cardiac hypertrophy, in that S100A1 inhibits alpha1 adrenergic stimulation of hypertrophic genes, including MYH7, ACTA1 and S100B. In a rat model of myocardial infarction, intracoronary S100A1 adenoviral gene transfer restored sarcoplasmic reticular calcium transients and load, normalized intracellular sodium concentrations, reversed the pathologic expression of the fetal gene program, restored energy supply, normalized contractile function, preserved inotropic reserve, and reduced cardiac hypertrophy 1 week post-myocardial infarction. In support of the adenoviral experiments, S100A1 transgenic overexpressing mice subjected to myocardial infarction showed preserved contractile function, abrogated apoptosis, preserved sarcoplasmic reticulum calcium cycling and beta adrenergic signaling, prevention from cardiac hypertrophy and heart failure, as well as prolonged survival relative to non-transgenic controls.

S100A1 has also been identified as a novel regulator of endothelial cell post-ischemic angiogenesis, as patients with limb ischemia exhibited downregulation of S100A1 expression in hypoxic tissue.

In melanocytic cells, S100A1 gene expression may be regulated by MITF.

Clinical Significance
S100A1 has shown efficacy in feasibility in treating heart failure symptoms in large, preclinical models and human cardiomyocytes, and thus shows great promise for clinical trials.

Reduced expression of this protein has been implicated in cardiomyopathies, and left ventricular assist device-based therapy does not restore S100A1 levels in patients. S100A1 has shown promise as an early diagnostic biomarker for acute myocardial ischemia, presenting with a distinct timecourse in human plasma following an ischemic event relative to traditional markers creatine kinase, CKMB and troponin I. This injury-released, extracellular pool of S100A1 was investigated in neonatal murine cardiomyocytes and was shown to prevent apoptosis via an ERK1/2-dependent pathway, suggesting that the release of S100A1 from injured cells is an intrinsic survival mechanism for viable myocardium. S100 has also shown promise as a biomarker for uncontrolled hyperoxic reoxygenation during cardiopulmonary bypass in infants with cyanotic heart disease and in adults. S100A1 gene transfer to engineered heart tissue was shown to augment contractile performance of the tissue implants, suggesting that S100A1 may be effective in facilitating cardiac tissue replacement therapy in heart failure patients. However, the clinical efficacy of this strategy remains to be determined.
In addition, multiple drugs, including Pentamidine, Amlexanox, Olopatadine, Cromolyn, and Propanolol, are known to bind to S100A1, although their affinities are often in the mid-micromolar range.

Interactions 

S100 interacts with 
PGM1 
S100B 
S100A4 
TRPM3
Titin
RYR2
SERCA2A
PLB
RYR1

References

Further reading

External links 
 

S100 proteins